HMS Tuscarora was a British anti-submarine yacht which served in a training role during the Second World War.

Originally built in 1897 as a luxury steam yacht, she was acquired and renovated for military service by the British Admiralty in January 1940 for service with the Royal Navy during the war as an anti-submarine yacht. Tuscarora was based at Campbeltown in Western Scotland, where she was exclusively employed in providing anti-submarine warfare training exercises for British and Allied submarines in the local sea area.

Construction and design
Tuscarora was built in 1897 by the Scottish shipbuilder Scotts as hull number 347, and was launched on 17 June that year at Scotts' Cartsdyke East, Greenock shipyard. She had a tonnage of 565 GRT and 303 NRT, with a Thames Measurement of 591 TM. Gross tonnage was recorded as 466 at the time of her loss.

Service
She was initially owned by William Clark of Glasgow, but in 1901 was sold to American owners, and in 1911 was sold to a Spanish owner and renamed Goizeko-Izzara. She returned to Britain in 1922, reverting to her original name in 1923.
 
In 1945, Tuscarora was returned to her owners, and in the following year was converted for commercial use, sold to a Panamanian company and renamed SS Anatoli. In 1952, the ship was re-engined, with a diesel engine replacing the old steam engine, and transferred to a Greek shipping company, being renamed MS Evgenia. The ship was renamed again in 1968, becoming the MS Alhelal, and was placed under the Saudi flag. She foundered and sank in heavy weather on 4 November 1968 on passage between Port Sudan and Jeddah with a cargo of seeds.

References

Books
 
 

1897 ships
Patrol vessels of the Royal Navy
Steam yachts